The following lists events that happened during 1947 in the People's Republic of Albania.

Incumbents
President: Omer Nishani, Chairman of the Presidium of the Constituent Assembly
Prime Minister: Enver Hoxha, Chairmen of the Council of Ministers

Events

February
10 February - United Nations Security Council Resolution 17 is passed. 
27 February - United Nations Security Council Resolution 19 is passed. It creates a three-member subcommittee to examine the dispute over the Straits of Corfu between the United Kingdom and Albania and to make a report on these facts.

April
9 April - United Nations Security Council Resolution 22 recommends that the United Kingdom and Albania take their dispute over the Straits of Corfu to the International Court of Justice.

References

 
1940s in Albania
Years of the 20th century in Albania